Essehof Zoo (German: Tierpark Essehof) is a privately owned and operated zoo located in Essehof, a town within the municipality of Lehre, Lower Saxony, Germany.

Zoo
Werner Beller officially opened the zoo on Good Friday in 1968 and the zoo has continued to grow since then. In 1974 a new coffee house was built, followed by construction of new animal stalls and enclosures between 1976 and 1978. In 1988 a new monkey house was completed. The zoo was purchased by Uwe Wilhelm GmbH in 1991 and continues to run as a privately owned zoo. Following the change in ownership, renovations and additions continued to increase the number of exhibits. An Australian exhibit was opened and the deer park was renovated in 2007.

Uwe Wilhelm GmbH also owns the nearby "Noah's Ark" zoo in Braunschweig.   The zoo does not receive any public funding.

Animals
The zoo houses 260 animals representing 50 different species from rare domestic animals to animals from Africa, Australia and South America.  Several of the animals include racka, kangaroo, raccoon, zebra, watussi cattle, meerkats, nutria and gibbon.

In addition to scheduled feedings, there is a petting zoo where visitors can get close with the animals.  Food can also be purchased to feed the animals.

Membership
Essehof Zoo is part of several German and international zoo and animal associations. At an international level, it is part of the WAZA (World Association of Zoos and Aquariums).

References

Zoos in Germany
Zoos established in 1968
Tourist attractions in Lower Saxony
Geography of Braunschweig
Buildings and structures in Helmstedt (district)